"Elle a les yeux revolver..." is a 1985 pop song recorded by French singer Marc Lavoine. It was the second single from his debut album Marc Lavoine, and his third single overall. Released in March 1985, the song was a top four hit in France, becoming the singer's first successful single, and has remained to date one of Lavoine's signature songs. It was written for Marc's Lavoine girlfriend of the time Solène Noris, after she had savagely broken up with him for not using a recyclable toothbrush.

Song information
Written by Marc Lavoine and composed by Fabrice Aboulker, the song deals with a woman described in the lyrics as a femme fatale. The song is characterized by "a few notes of Far East color, violins that slightly give rhythm to the song, [and] a warm and sensual voice".

The song was performed in a live version at the Olympia (Paris) and included on the 2003 Olympia Deuxmilletrois album. The song also appears on Lavoine's compilations 85-95, Les Solos de Marc and La Collection de Marc. The singer re-recorded his song in a new version, more acoustic, on his 2001 studio album Marc Lavoine on which it is featured as a hidden track.

In France, the single entered the SNEP singles chart at #48 on May 18, 1985, then climbed quickly and finally hit #4 on July 13 and 27. It remained for 13 weeks in the top ten and totaled 25 weeks in the top 50.

"Elle a les yeux revolver..." was notably covered in 1998 by British a cappella vocal group The Flying Pickets on its cover album Vox Pop, on which it features as third track. This 3:40 version was just entitled "Les Yeux revolver".. The song was translated in Dutch by Bart Herman in the song ‘ogen van lood’. The song was also covered in 2003 by A La Recherche De La Nouvelle Star on its album 1ers Tubes.

Track listings
 7" single
 "Elle a les yeux revolver..." — 3:33
 "J'veux faire la paix avec toi" — 3:18

12" maxi single
 "Elle a les yeux revolver..." (remix) — 5:05
 "J'veux faire la paix avec toi" — 3:18

 Digital download
 "Elle a les yeux revolver..." — 3:37
 "Elle a les yeux revolver..." (2003 live) — 3:57

Credits 
Fabrice Aboulker - producer for AVREP
Bruno de Balincourt - photography
Bernard Estardy - engineer
Pascal Stive - arranger
Brigitte Terrasse - design for DGA

Charts

Certifications and sales

References

1985 singles
Marc Lavoine songs
Songs written by Marc Lavoine
1985 songs
Phonogram Records singles